Bloomingdale is a city in Chatham County, Georgia, United States. As of the 2020 census, the city had a population of 2,790. It is part of the Savannah Metropolitan Statistical Area.

Geography
Bloomingdale is located along the northwestern border of Chatham County at  (32.124122, -81.307211). It is bordered to the northeast by Port Wentworth, to the east by Pooler, to the south by a western portion of Savannah, and to the northwest by Effingham County. U.S. Route 80 runs east–west through the center of Bloomingdale, and Interstate 16 runs parallel to it through the southern part of the city, with access from Exit 152. Both highways lead east  to downtown Savannah.

Demographics

2020 census

As of the 2020 United States census, there were 2,790 people, 1,272 households, and 791 families residing in the city.

2010 census
As of the census of 2010, there were 2,713 people, 1,001 households, and 752 families residing in the city. The racial makeup of the city was 89.0% White, 8.0% African American, 1.5% Asian, 1.0% Native American, 1.7% from other races, and 1.8% from two or more races. Hispanic or Latino of any race were 4.7% of the population.

There were 1,141 households, out of which 30.1% had children under the age of 18 living with them, 53.8% were married couples living together, 12.9% had a female householder with no husband present, and 27.8% were non-families. 22.9% of all households were made up of individuals, and 8.9% had someone living alone who was 65 years of age or older.  The average household size was 2.63 and the average family size was 3.05.

In the city, the population was spread out, with 23.8% under the age of 18, 8.3% from 18 to 24, 27.4% from 25 to 44, 27.9% from 45 to 64, and 12.7% who were 65 years of age or older.  The median age was 37.4 years. For every 100 females, there were 104.1 males.

The median income for a household in the city was $51,510, and the median income for a family was $55,950. Males had a median income of $37,404 versus $22,409 for females. The per capita income for the city was $22,030.  About 3.8% of families and 8.0% of the population were below the poverty line, including 5.0% of those under age 18 and 21.2% of those age 65 or over.

References

External links
City of Bloomingdale official website

Cities in Georgia (U.S. state)
Cities in Chatham County, Georgia
Savannah metropolitan area